Thuner is the Frisian god of thunder and oldest son of Weda (in the Scandinavian mythology his name is Thor)

Limestone figure

Thuner is an imposing limestone figure carved by John Michael Rysbrack (1693-1770). Thuner, the god of thunder, is one of the seven Saxon gods, each representing a day of the week.  It was carved circa 1730 for Sir Richard Temple, Viscount Cobham (1675-1749) for his garden in Stowe, Buckinghamshire. On the base of the sculpture, Thuner's name is carved in runes beneath a thunderbolt. Originally the statues were set around an altar in an open grove, known as the Saxon Temple at Stowe; later they were placed in Stowe's Gothic Temple of Liberty. They formed part of an important group of buildings and statuary erected by Lord Cobham during the 1730s, which embodied a political programme championing Whig beliefs in historic British liberty.

Rysbrack was one of the most important sculptors working Britain at this time. A native of the Netherlands, he came over to England in about 1720, and soon established himself as a sculptor of monuments, portraits and busts. The Saxon gods, however, are unique in his work; neither are similar figures known by any other sculptors.

Bibliography

Collections of the Victoria and Albert Museum